Jiří Jeslínek (born 30 September 1987 in Prague) is a Czech football who plays as a striker.

Career
In early 2011, Jeslínek signed a three-year contract with a Ukrainian Premier League side Kryvbas.
In July 2013 Jeslínek returned to the Czech Republic, signing for Mladá Boleslav, before moving to the Kazakhstan Premier League in January 2014, signing for FC Tobol.

References

External links
 
 
 

1987 births
Living people
Footballers from Prague
Czech footballers
Czech Republic youth international footballers
Czech Republic under-21 international footballers
Czech expatriate footballers
Czech First League players
Ukrainian Premier League players
Kazakhstan Premier League players
Slovenian PrvaLiga players
Liga II players
AC Sparta Prague players
SK Dynamo České Budějovice players
SK Kladno players
FK Baník Most players
FC Kryvbas Kryvyi Rih players
FC Tobol players
NK Celje players
FC Rapid București players
FC Dacia Chișinău players
Association football forwards
Expatriate footballers in Ukraine
Czech expatriate sportspeople in Ukraine
Expatriate footballers in Kazakhstan
Czech expatriate sportspeople in Kazakhstan
Expatriate footballers in Slovenia
Czech expatriate sportspeople in Slovenia
Expatriate footballers in Romania
Czech expatriate sportspeople in Romania
Expatriate footballers in Moldova
Czech expatriate sportspeople in Moldova